Kristian Bergheim (6 June 1926 in Bærum – 30 May 2010) was a noted saxophonist, considered one of the few in Norway of international caliber.

Biography 
Bergheim was raised in Asker and in Stabekk in the neighboring municipality Bærum, where he lived most of his life. He played in a number of bands and orchestras before devoting his professional life to music, in 1948. He was repeatedly named best Norwegian saxophonist when such contests were common in the 1950s and 1960s.

He led his own bands and orchestras starting in 1960, focusing mostly on swing. He won the highest Norwegian jazz award, Buddyprisen, in 1978 and the Gammleng-prisen in 1991. Because of a lung ailment, he retired in 1990.

Bergheim was for some time married to noted singer and actress Anita Thallaug.

Honors 
1978: Buddyprisen
1991: Gammlengprisen in the class Jazz

Discography
 Jazz in Norway, volume 1 (RCA, 1954)
 Arvid Gram Paulsen, Mikkel Flagstad, Kristian Bergheim (1977, Herman)
 Liva at Malla, (1977, Norjazz)
 Rainbow Session - vol 2, with Bjarne Nerem, Kristian Bergheim (1990) OCP 101-2

References

External links 
Kristian Bergheim in memoriam by Jan Ditlev Hansen at NRK Jazz

1926 births
2010 deaths
Musicians from Bærum
Norwegian jazz saxophonists
20th-century saxophonists